Audun Endestad (born January 19, 1953) is a Norwegian-born American cross-country skier, author and field guide. He is a past Olympic, World and National Team cross-country skier.

Biography
Audun Gudmund Endestad was born in Bryggja, Sogn og Fjordane, Norway. Endestad  competed from 1984 to 1997. He finished 18th in the 50 km event at the 1984 Winter Olympics in Sarajevo. He is a six-time Great American Ski Chase champion and 13-time National cross-country skiing champion.

Family
Endestad is married to Sally Zack, a former Olympic, World and National Team Bicycle Racer, who competed for the United States in Olympic cycling in 1988 and 1992. They live in Alaska and own the Endestad Atomic Ski Camp.

Cross-country skiing results
All results are sourced from the International Ski Federation (FIS).

Olympic Games

World Championships

World Cup

Season standings

References

Selected works

External links
 Sports-Reference.com profile.
 International Ski Federation athlete information

1953 births
Living people
American male cross-country skiers
Cross-country skiers at the 1984 Winter Olympics
Norwegian male cross-country skiers
Olympic cross-country skiers of the United States
People from Vågsøy
Norwegian emigrants to the United States
Sportspeople from Vestland